The second series of Gladiators aired in the UK from 28 August 1993 to 1 January 1994.

Gladiators

Episodes

 Lisa collided with Zodiac during Powerball and was deemed unfit to continue.
 Chris’ right hand was damaged during his Joust with Shadow, which meant that no men's Eliminator was played and Tim automatically went through to the quarter-finals.
 Rowan pulled out due to food poisoning. Paula replaced her as the highest-scoring female loser from the heats.
 Steve retired after two events due to a stomach virus. Gary replaced him as the highest-scoring male loser from the quarter-finals.
 Due to time constraints, only 5 events were played and highlights of Danger Zone were shown.
 These events had the female Gladiators against the male contenders.
 After Gary's Duel with Shadow, he tied with Neil on 28 points, but he pulled out because of an injury from before the show and decided that Neil would face against John in the Eliminator.

References

1993 British television seasons
1994 British television seasons
series two